In the period from the 1830s until the First World War, dozens of German-language newspapers in the United States were published. Although the first German immigrants had arrived by 1700, most German-language newspapers flourished during the era of mass immigration from Germany that began in the 1820s.

Germans were the first non-English speakers to publish newspapers in the U.S., and by 1890, over 1,000 German-language newspapers were being published in the United States. The first German language paper was Die Philadelphische Zeitung, published by Benjamin Franklin in Philadelphia beginning in 1732; it failed after a year. In 1739, Christopher Sauer established Der Hoch-Deutsche Pennsylvanische Geschicht-Schreiber, later known as Die Germantauner Zeitung.  It was one of the most influential pre-Revolutionary weekly newspapers in the colonies. By 1802, Pennsylvanian Germans published newspapers not only in Philadelphia, but also in Lancaster, Reading, Easton, Harrisburg, York, and Norristown. The oldest German Catholic newspaper, the Cincinnati Archdiocese's Der Wahrheitsfreund, began publishing in 1837. By 1881, it was one of five German papers in the Cincinnati market.

The newspapers were hit by two rounds of closures due to sudden drops in advertising revenue. As the U.S. entered World War I, many advertisers stopped placing advertisements in German newspapers. Later, with the onset of Prohibition in 1920, the remaining newspapers faded, as older generations died and newer generations chose not to embrace a German-American identity, with Americanization. A few America newspapers in the German language remain extant today.

Current

California
 Neue Presse USA, Hemet, 1986–present

Florida
 Florida Sun, Orlando

New York
 New Yorker Staats-Zeitung, New York, 1834–present

Pennsylvania
 Amerika Woche, Gladwyne, 1956–present
 Hiwwe wie Driwwe, Kutztown, 1997–present (written in the Pennsylvania German dialect)

Defunct

Arkansas
 Arkansas Freie Presse, Little Rock, 1874-1876
 Das Arkansas Echo, 1891–1932
Stuttgart Germania, Stuttgart, 1895
 Die Arkansas Staatszeitung, 1869-1917

California
 California Staats-Zeitung, San Francisco, 1852–1918
Süd-California Post, Los Angeles, 1887–1914

Illinois
 Illinois Staats-Zeitung, Chicago, 1848–1922
 Belleviller Zeitung, Belleville, 1849–1917
 Der Proletarier, Chicago, 1853
 Deutscher Anzeiger, Freeport, 1853–1917
 Arbeiter-Zeitung, Chicago, 1877–1931
 Vorbote, Chicago, 1874–1924
 Die Fäckel, Chicago, 1879-1919
 Eintracht, Chicago, 1922–2017

Iowa
 Iowa Tribüne, Burlington, 1861–1899
 Der Demokrat, Davenport, 1851–1918
 Ostfriesische Nachrichten, Dubuque, 1881–1971
 Le Mars Herold, Le Mars, 1884–1918

Louisiana
 Die Deutsche Zeitung, New Orleans, 1848–1907
 Die Glocke, New Orleans, 1848–1850
 Louisiana Zuschauer, Lafayette, 1849–?
 Louisiana Staatszeitung, New Orelans, 1850–1866, merged into Die Deutsche Zeitung
 Das Arbeiterblatt, New Orleans, 1850–1851
 Deutsche Courier No. 2, 1850–?
 Der Alligator, New Orleans, 1851–?
 Lafayetter Zeitung, Lafeyette, 1851–?
 Täglische New Orleans Journal, New Orleans, 1866–1867
 Täglische New Orleans Deutsche Presse, New Orleans, 1868–1869, merged into Die Deutsche Zeitung
 Der Familienfreund, 1869–1903
 Der Kinderfreund, 1872–1874
 Die Laterne, 1872–?
 Louisiana Deutsches Journal, 1876–1877
 Der Altenheimbote, 1892–1918
 Der Negerfreund, 1897–1947
 The Southern Lutheran, 1903–1917
 Neue Deutsche Zeitung, 1907–1917

Maryland
 Baltimore Wecker, Baltimore, 1851–1877
 Der Deutsche Correspondent, Baltimore, 1841–1918, merged into Baltimore Correspondent
 Bayrisches Wochenblatt, Baltimore, 1880–1919, merged into Baltimore Correspondent
 (Täglicher) Baltimore Correspondent, Baltimore, 1919–1976

Massachusetts
 Neu England Rundschau, Holyoke, 1884–1942
 New England Staaten Zeitung, Holyoke, 1875–1901

Michigan
 Nordamerikanische Wochenpost, Warren, 1854–2022

Minnesota
 Der Nordstern, St. Cloud, 1874–1931
 Minnesota Staats-Zeitung, St. Paul, 1858-1877
 Minnesota Volksblatt, St. Paul, 1861-1877
 Die Volkszeitung, St. Paul, 1877-1881
 Wöchentliche Volkszeitung, 1881-1921
 Tägliche Volkszeitung, 1881-1941

Missouri
 Anzeiger des Westens, St. Louis, 1835–1898
 Westliche Post, St. Louis, 1857–1938
 Mississippi Blätter, St. Louis, 1857–1932
 Hermanner Volksblatt, Hermann, c.1856–1928
 Osage County Volksblatt, 1896–1917

Nebraska 
 Nebraska Staats-Anzeiger, Lincoln, 1880–1901

New York
Amerika Woche, New York City, 1999–present
Buffalo Demokrat, Buffalo, 1848–1918
Buffalo Freie Presse, Buffalo, 1860–1910
Der Katholische Deutschamerikaner, 1910
Neue Volks, New York City, 1932–1949
Neue Volkszeitung, New York City, 1932–1949
New-Yorker Abend-Zeitung, New York City, 1851–1874
New Yorker Herold, New York City, 1880–1934
New-Yorker Tages-Nachrichten, New York City, 1870–1896
New Yorker Volkszeitung, New York City, 1878–1932
Oneida Demokrat, Utica, 1855–1871
Der Volksfreund, Buffalo, 1838–1943

North Dakota
 Der Staats Anzeiger, Bismarck, 1906–1945

Ohio
 Cincinnati Freie Presse, Cincinnati, 1872–1964
 (Tägliches) Cincinnati Volksblatt, Cincinnati, 1863–1919
 Cincinnati Volksfreund, Cincinnati, 1850–1908
 Hochwächter, Cincinnati, 1845–1849
 Der Wahrheitsfreund, Cincinnati, 1837–1907
 Ohio Waisenfreund
Westliche Blätter, Cincinnati, 1865–1919

Oregon

Pennsylvania
 Alte und neue Welt, Philadelphia, 1834-1844 
 Die Germantauner Zeitung, 1739
 Philadelphia Demokrat, Philadelphia, 1838–1918
 Philadelphische Staatsbote, Philadelphia
 Die Philadelphische Zeitung, Philadelphia, 1732
 Die York Gazette, 1796
 Freiheits-Freund, Pittsburgh, 1834–1901
 Pittsburger Volksblatt, Pittsburgh, 1859–1901
 Volksblatt und Freiheits-Freund, Pittsburgh, 1901–1942

South Carolina
 Der Teutone, Charleston, 1844–?

South Dakota
 Dakota Freie Presse, Yankton, 1874–1954

Tennessee
 Die Stimme die Volk, Memphis, 1854-1860
 Die Anzeiger des Südens, Memphis, 1858-1876
 Die Neue Zeit, Memphis, 1862-187?
 Memphis Correspondent, Memphis, 1870-?
 Memphis Journal, Memphis, 1876-1878
 Nashviller Demokrat, Nashville, 1866-1871
 Tennessee Staatszeitung, Nashville, 1866-1869

Virginia
 Richmonder Anzeiger, Richmond, 1854-?
 Virginia Staats-Gazette, Richmond, 1870-1904

Washington DC
 Washington Journal, Washington DC, 1859–1999, merger with Amerika Woche

West Virginia
 Deutsche Zeitung, Wheeling, 1901-1916
 West Virginia patriot, Wheeling, 1916-191?
 West Virginische staats-zeitung, Wheeling, 1887-1901, formed by the merger of Deutsche zeitung (Wheeling, W. Va.: 1876) (non-extant), and Wheelinger volksblatt (non-extant).
 Wheelinger volksblatt, Wheeling, 1880-1887
 Virginische staats-zeitung / Virginia state gazette, Wheeling, 1848-1863, continued by West Virginia staats zeitung (non-extant)
 Der Arbeiter-Freund, Wheeling, 1865-1887, absorbed Patriot (Wheeling, W. Va.) (non-extant) and was continued by Deutsche Zeitung von West Virginien (non-extant).

Wisconsin
 Die Deutsche Frauen-Zeitung, Milwaukee, founded in 1852.
Manitowoc Post, Manitowoc, 1881–1924 
 Milwaukee Herold, Milwaukee, 1860–1931
 Nord Stern, La Crosse
 Der Nord-Westen, Manitowoc, 1860–1909
 Shawano County Wochenblatt, Shawano, 1885-1901
 Shawano County Volksbote-Wochenblatt, Shawano, 1897-1935

National newspapers
 Amerika Woche, 1972–present
 Der Ruf, distributed to German POWs across the United States during World War II

See also
 German American journalism
 German Americans
 List of German language newspapers of Ontario

References

External links
 "Chronicling America" from the Library of Congress lists 2500 German newspapers and offers full-text digital access to 24 German-language newspaper titles—over 150,000 pages, with more added annually.]

 
German-language mass media in the United States